NiGHTS is a video game character from the games Nights into Dreams and Nights: Journey of Dreams, developed and published by Sega. Nights is a "Nightmaren" who resides in Nightopia, a dream world where the dreams of all human beings are acted out every night.

Creation and conception
Naoto Ohshima was the original Nights creator and designer, while Kazuyuki Hoshino was the character designer for the video game Nights into Dreams. The character design incorporated Japanese, European, and American stylistics in order to give Nights as universal an appeal as possible. In the context of the games, Nights is a part of every human's subconscious, and so was purposely designed to be neither male nor female. By the time of the sequel, Nights: Journey of Dreams, Ohshima had left Sega, and Kazuyuki Hoshino was placed in charge of character design for the game. Takashi Iizuka, the lead game designer, felt that, with Hoshino, they captured the style used for the character in the original game.

Nights' personality is described by Iizuka as "a mirror of the child's personality." Nights' speaking role in Journey of Dreams was performed by Julissa Aguirre, who gave the character a British-English accent to suit the style of the game. In addition, Nights was made genderless, leaving the impression of the character "totally up to the player", according to Iizuka.

Character
Nights wears a purple jester-style hat and outfit, with a diamond-shaped, red jewel on the chest. Their personality is described as free-spirited and rebellious. The storybook NiGHTS: Flying Through the Sky Without Wings depicted NiGHTS as rude and impatient. In NiGHTS: Journey of Dreams, the character was similarly portrayed with a childlike and mischievous, yet friendly personality.

Yuji Naka and Naoto Ohshima explained that the character is "not a hero from the good dreams, but a hero from the nightmares. In other words, there's just a little bit of a scary element to them. They are cute but frightening. NiGHTS has a dual male/female character image. With that image in mind we then bring in the circus like element. The nightmare world is similar to the circus. In the darkness a single spot-light shines, creating the vividly coloured stage. This kind of element is included inside the nightmare's darkness to show the beauty of the place. So with the NiGHTS' character and the Nightmarens all gathered together it gives the impression of a circus group. Although NiGHTS looks a little like a jester, when you find them in your dreams wonderful things happen and a new hope is born within."

Game appearances
Nights first appeared in the video game Nights into Dreams on the Sega Saturn. The second game in the series, Nights: Journey of Dreams, is on the Wii. Sega Superstars for PlayStation 2 features a game with Nights, which utilized the EyeToy peripheral.  Nights also appeared in the sampler game Christmas Nights on the Sega Saturn. Takashi Iizuka reported that he is very interested in making Nights 3, but it is the management's decision whether or not to proceed.

Other appearances
Nights has appeared in many other games besides the series, including Sonic Adventure (in the Casinopolis level), Sonic Adventure 2 (in the City Escape and Radical Highway levels), Shadow the Hedgehog (in Lethal Highway, the title screen appears in a billboard without any text), and also in Sonic Adventure and Sonic Adventure 2, the player can raise a chao that resembles Nights. Nights also appears in Sonic Pinball Party, Sonic Shuffle, Billy Hatcher and the Giant Egg, Sega Superstars, both Sonic Riders and Sonic Riders: Zero Gravity (as a secret character) and Sega Superstars Tennis. Nights also makes a cameo appearance in Sonic & Sega All-Stars Racing as the flagman, and later appears playable alongside Reala in Sonic & All-Stars Racing Transformed. The character also makes a cameo appearance in a downloadable level of Sonic Lost World. The level is named Nightmare Zone, which consists of multiple boss battles from the original game in the series.

Nights has also made a guest appearance in Phantasy Star Online I & II Plus, in Episode 2.

Nights has also appeared in Archie Comics' Worlds Unite crossover between its Sonic the Hedgehog and Mega Man titles, where they are one of many Sega and Capcom heroes recruited by Miles "Tails" Prower and Air Man to battle Sigma.

In Sega's Shenmue series, Nights appears in the form of two capsule toys, NiGHTS 1 & NiGHTS 2, that protagonist Ryo Hazuki can collect from one of the various machines scattered throughout Shenmue and Shenmue II.

Reception
Nights was a runner-up for Electronic Gaming Monthlys Coolest Mascot of 1996 (behind Mario).

References 

Fictional androgynes
Fictional humanoids
Fictional jesters
Sega protagonists
Shapeshifter characters in video games
Teenage characters in video games
Video game characters introduced in 1996
Video game characters who use magic